Damias esthla is a moth of the family Erebidae.

References

Damias
Moths described in 1918